706 is a 2019 Hindi paranormal thriller film directed by Shravan Tiwari and produced by Sandip Patel. The film was released on 11 January 2019.

Plot

The film opens with the disappearance of a noted Mumbai physician Dr Anil Asthana. Deputy Commissioner of Police, Mr. Shekhawat ( Atul Kulkarni) assures his wife, Suman, that they are doing all they can but she is dismissive, this assurance, like the others before it, is empty. Suman, also a psychiatrist doctor, returns to her hospital. There is a new patient, a 10-year-old boy, who suffers from convulsions but whose reports are perfectly normal. Suman is about to discharge the boy but his parents beseech her to examine him; the boy had specifically asked for her after his last bout of convulsions.

Suman interviews the boy. He looks at her balefully and says he knows everything. He says that the missing Dr Asthana is dead and the body is in the woods outside Lonavla. Shekhawat is called and the body is found exactly where the boy had said. Upon questioning by Shekhawat, the boy alludes to a ‘woman whose anklets sounded so sweet’ and Shekhawat recoils in horror. It is revealed that Shekhawat had a lover (with sweet sounding anklets) in Benares. She became pregnant, there was an argument and Shekhawat, who could not risk his own marriage, strangled her and buried her body in Benares. She returned as a ghost and began chasing Shekhawat. Shekhawat sought the advice of a spiritual master, Dinkar, who prepared a charmed talisman; as long as Shekhawat wore the talisman the ghost could not harm him. Shekhawat sends a video of the convulsing boy to Dinkar. Dinkar says the boy is possessed and Shekhawat, though protected by the talisman, should stay away from the boy.

Shekhawat begins his investigations. The boy and his parents were in room 706 of a hotel on a night when another youth leaped to his death from the roof of the same hotel. The hotel security cameras show Suman visiting the hotel. Suman denies this. Shekhawat asks why she hurried to meet him when he mentioned the hotel. She admits she was indeed there. The youth was her patient. His lover had left him to marry an NRI overseas. The youth became suicidal. Suman had prescribed sedatives. On the night of his death Suman had gone to check on him but she had been too late; he had jumped to his death. Shekhawat tells Suman that the ghost of the youth has possessed the boy. Suman dismisses the idea. Shekhawat sighs. He is not an impressionable ignoramus. He was an engineer before he joined the police, he is a fierce rationalist, but his own experiences with his lover ghost have made him aware of the other world. Suman is not convinced.

Shekhawat visits his spiritual master Dinkar in Benares. Dinkar confirms that it is indeed the ghost of the youth inside the boy, it wants revenge against Suman. The youth ghost is working with the lover's ghost, they want to destroy Shekhawat and Suman. What can be done, asks Shekhawat. Dinkar says there are two options: get the youth's ghost to leave the boy or kill the boy. Dinkar says the youth is set upon revenge and will not leave the boy so the latter is the only option.

Shekhawat returns to Mumbai and discusses the options with Suman. The boy must be killed. Suman reveals that she had taken the youth as her lover but had tired of him and broken it off. He continued pursuing her so she gave him an overdose of an anti depressive which caused an emotional rush that led him to kill himself. She killed her own husband with similar overmedication to escape her dreary marriage. Suman defiantly refuses to kill the boy. Shekhawat gives her the evening to think it over. In the morning, having worked out there is no other way, she agrees. She asks for protection; Shekhawat gives her the talisman. She calls in the parents of the boy and explains that she needs their consent to perform a deep psychological experiment on the boy in the room (706) where the trauma had begun. They agree. She brings the boy, sedated, to the room in the hotel. She now speaks to the ghost of the youth. She will go to him, he will leave the boy. She kills herself and the ghost leaves the boy and Shekhawat comes, now vulnerable without his talisman, returns home where the ghost of his lover is waiting for him as the film ends.

Cast
 Mohan Agashe as Dr Anil Asthana
 Divya Dutta as Dr Suman Asthana
 Atul Kulkarni as D.C.P. Shekhawat
 Anupam Shyam as Baba in Banaras
 Raayo S. Bakhirta as Rahul Bora
 Yashvit as Neeraj Jaimal

References

External links
 

2019 films
2010s Hindi-language films
2019 horror thriller films
Indian horror thriller films
Hindi-language thriller films